William Lancaster Owen (8 November 1843 - 28 November 1911) was a British civil engineer primarily with the Great Western Railway.

Career
In 1868 he took a commission as a First Lieutenant in the 1st Gloucestershire Engineer Volunteer Corps which he held until 29 October 1873.

He entered the service of the Great Western Railway as assistant engineer in 1865. In 1872 he was Engineer to the Monmouthshire Railway and Canal Company, but returned to the Great Western Railway in 1875 where he remained until retirement in 1891.

He was responsible for some important works on the Great Western Railway including the rebuilding of Newport railway station in 1878, Torquay railway station in 1878 and Penzance railway station in 1879, and also the conversion from broad gauge to standard gauge of the Hereford to Bristol line with J.W. Armstrong. In 1885 he succeeded his father as Chief Civil Engineer of the Great Western Railway.

He was elected an Associate of the Institute of Civil Engineers in 1874 and made a Member on 28 March 1882.

Personal life
He was born at Bath on 8 November 1843, the son of William George Owen (1810-1885) (Chief Civil Engineer of the Great Western Railway 1868-1885) and Amelia Sarah Martin (1818 - 1896).

He married Helen Evans, second daughter of William Evans on 24 May 1871 at St Woollos Church and they had two children:
William Cecil Owen (1872 - 1959)
Helen Mary Lancaster Owen (1883 - 1941)

He lived in retirement at 26 Cornwall Gardens, London and died in 1911 aged 68 leaving an estate of £17,868.

References

English civil engineers
1843 births
1911 deaths
People from Bath, Somerset
Great Western Railway people